Fellner & Helmer was an architecture studio founded in 1873 by Austrian architects Ferdinand Fellner and Hermann Helmer.

They designed over 200 buildings (mainly opera houses and apartment buildings) across Europe in the late 19th century and early 20th century, which helped bind the Austro-Hungarian Empire together and cement Vienna as its cultural center.  While most of the work stood in the former Austro-Hungarian Empire, others can be found from Switzerland to present-day Ukraine.  Frequent collaborators for integrated exterior and interior art work include Gustav Klimt, Hans Makart, Theodor Friedl, and other significant artists.

Theatres by Ferdinand Fellner 

 1871–72 Stadttheater, Vienna, Austria (destroyed by fire in 1884). With Ferdinand Fellner the Older.
 1871–75 National Theatre and Opera, Timișoara, Romania (rebuilt after destroyed by fires in 1880 and 1920, respectively). With Ferdinand Fellner the Older.

Theatres by Fellner and Helmer 

Theatres designed by Fellner & Helmer
 1874–75 Népszínház, Budapest, Hungary (demolished 1965)
 1881–82 Mahen Theatre in Brno, Czech Republic, (one of the first theatres in Europe with electrical lighting)
 1881–83 "Stadttheater" in Liberec, Czech Republic
 1882–83 Szeged National Theatre, Hungary
 1883–85 Croatian National Theatre in Rijeka, Croatia
 1884–86 Theatre in Karlovy Vary, Czech Republic
 1884–87 Opera Theater, Odessa, Ukraine
 1885–86 Slovak National Theatre - Old building (as "Königliches Freistädtisches Theater"), Bratislava, Slovakia, 1886
 1886–87 Prague State Opera (as "Neues Deutsches Theater"), Prague, Czech Republic
 1887–88 Ronacher, Vienna, Austria (altered after fire)

 1888–89 Volkstheater (previously Deutsches Volkstheater), Vienna, Austria
 1890–91 Opera House, Zürich, Switzerland
 1891–92 Komische Oper in Berlin, Germany
 1892–93 State Theatre in Salzburg, Austria
 1892–94 Hessisches Staatstheater Wiesbaden, Germany

 1893–95 Tonhalle, Zürich, Switzerland
 1894–95 Croatian National Theatre in Zagreb, Croatia
 1894–96 Iaşi National Theatre, Romania
 1895–96 Vígszínház in Budapest, Hungary
 1895–96 Katona József Theatre, Kecskemet, Hungary
 1896–97 Konzerthaus Ravensburg, Germany
 1898–99 Opernhaus in Graz, Austria
 1898–99 Stadttheater in Berndorf, Austria
 1899–1900 Oradea National Theatre, Oradea, Romania
 1899–1900 Deutsches Schauspielhaus, Hamburg, Germany
 1901–02 Stadttheater Fürth, Germany
 1902 Theater an der Wien, Vienna, Austria (altered 1960–1961)
 1903–04 Wilam Horzyca Theatre, Toruń, Poland 
 1904–05 Theatre in Chernivtsi, Ukraine
 1904–06 Ivan Vazov National Theatre, Sofia, Bulgaria
 1904–06 Cluj-Napoca National Theatre, Cluj-Napoca, Romania
 1906–07 Theatre in Jablonec nad Nisou, Czech Republic
 1906–07 Stadttheater Gießen, Germany
 1906–09 Theatre in Mladá Boleslav, Czech Republic
 1908–09 Stadttheater, Baden bei Wien, Austria
 1909–10 Stadttheater in Klagenfurt, Austria (expansion 1996-98 by Günther Domenig)
 1909–10 Adam Mickiewicz Theatre, Cieszyn, Poland
 1910–13 Konzerthaus, Vienna, Austria
 1911–13 Akademietheater, Vienna, Austria

Other buildings
 1881 the István Károlyi or Károlyi-Csekonics Palace, Múzeum utca 17 in Budapest's Palace District, Hungary
 1885 Palace Modello in Rijeka, Croatia
 1894 Palais Rothschild, Prinz-Eugen-Straße, Vienna, Austria
 1894–95 Palais Lanckoronski, Vienna, Austria
 1897 Castle, Žinkovy, Czech Republic
 1897–1898 Noble Casino, Lviv, Ukraine 
 Colonnade Park (Czech: Sadová kolonáda), Karlovy Vary, Czech Republic
 Grandhotel Pupp, Karlovy Vary, Czech Republic
 Hotel Slovan (as "Hotel Waldeck", 1893) in Plzeň, Czech Republic
 Imperial bath (Bath I), Karlovy Vary, Czech Republic
 Market Colonnade, Karlovy Vary, Czech Republic
 Art Pavilion in Zagreb, Croatia, 1898
 Palace of Justice, Suceava, Romania, 1885
 1898–1900 Goetz Palace in Brzesko, Poland
 1899–1900 Hotel George, Lviv, Ukraine
 Potocki Palace, Antoniny, Ukraine
 Villa, 20 Mickiewicza Street in Toruń, Poland
 Semmering: Hotel Panhans
 Semmering (Niederösterreich) - Dependance Waldesruhe 1908
 Semmering (Niederösterreich) - Dependance Fürstenhof
 Department store Kastner & Öhler in Graz (1914)

Gallery

Sources

Notes

External links

Architecture firms of Austria
Austrian architects
Art Nouveau architects
Theatre architects
 
1873 establishments in Austria